The Ithaca Central Railroad  is a  shortline railroad operating in New York and Pennsylvania, owned by Watco. The ITHR leases and operates the Norfolk Southern-owned Ithaca Secondary from Sayre, Pennsylvania (Norfolk Southern interchange), to Ludlowville, New York. The railroad began operations on December 8, 2018, serving its primary customer, the Cargill Cayuga Rock Salt Mine, in Lansing, New York. The railroad has the capability to haul various commodities such as salt, coal, plastics, and magnesium chloride.

The railroad uses two ex-Union Pacific EMD SD40-2 (SD45 carbody) locomotives, WAMX 4247 and WAMX 4248. On January 30, 2019, the ITHR received a third EMD SD40-2, WAMX 4241.

References

Railway companies established in 2018
New York (state) railroads
Pennsylvania railroads
Watco